In probability theory, tau-leaping, or τ-leaping, is an approximate method for the simulation of a stochastic system. It is based on the Gillespie algorithm, performing all reactions for an interval of length tau before updating the propensity functions. By updating the rates less often this sometimes allows for more efficient simulation and thus the consideration of larger systems.

Many variants of the basic algorithm have been considered.

Algorithm
The algorithm is analogous to the Euler method for deterministic systems, but instead of making a fixed change

the change is

where  is a Poisson distributed random variable with mean .

Given a state  with events  occurring at rate  and with state change vectors  (where  indexes the state variables, and  indexes the events), the method is as follows:

 Initialise the model with initial conditions .
 Calculate the event rates .
 Choose a time step . This may be fixed, or by some algorithm dependent on the various event rates.
 For each event  generate , which is the number of times each event occurs during the time interval .
 Update the state by

where  is the change on state variable  due to event . At this point it may be necessary to check that no populations have reached unrealistic values (such as a population becoming negative due to the unbounded nature of the Poisson variable ).
 Repeat from Step 2 onwards until some desired condition is met (e.g. a particular state variable reaches 0, or time  is reached).

Algorithm for efficient step size selection
This algorithm is described by Cao et al. The idea is to bound the relative change in each event rate  by a specified tolerance  (Cao et al. recommend , although it may depend on model specifics). Typically  is equal the highest order event rate, but this may be more complex in different situations (especially epidemiological models with non-linear event rates).

This algorithm typically requires computing  auxiliary values (where  is the number of state variables ), and should only require reusing previously calculated values . An important factor in this  since  is an integer value, then there is a minimum value by which it can change, preventing the relative change in  being bounded by 0, which would result in  also tending to 0.

 For each state variable , calculate the auxiliary values
 
 
 For each state variable , determine the highest order event in which it is involved, and obtain 
 Calculate time step  as
 

This computed  is then used in Step 3 of the  leaping algorithm.

References

Chemical kinetics
Computational chemistry
Monte Carlo methods
Stochastic simulation